Rima Ramanuj is an Indian television actress, She debuted as an actress in the Sony TV's television series Yeh Moh Moh Ke Dhaagey who plays Eijaz Khan's sister aka Mishri on the show. She also acted in the promotional Pepsi ad.

Career
Rima had seriously never thought of becoming an actor ever in her life. She did her schooling from Fatima Convent School, Bhavnagar and since her school days, her mother always motivated to be a part of extra-curricular activities. She also used to score well in her academics, which is how she completed her dentistry.

She is an choosy person and whenever she went for auditions, she would describe herself as an aspiring actor. But again, She have really worked hard. she came to Mumbai, completed my dentistry and took up a job first. Later, whenever she got audition calls, she used to carry her clothes. She used to go to work, and if got a call, she used to change according to the audition in a mall nearby and then attend the audition.

She did a ramp walk at Phoenix Marketcity (Pune) to raise fund for BETI.

Television

References

Living people
Indian television actresses
Actresses in Hindi television
Actresses from Ahmedabad
Year of birth missing (living people)